Below are the squads for the 2005 East Asian Football Championship tournament in Japan. There were 23 players in each squad, including 3 goalkeepers.

Coach:  Zhu Guanghu

Coach:  Zico

Coach:  Kim Myong-Song

Coach:  Jo Bonfrere

External links
Official Site
East Asian Cup 2005 at Rsssf

EAFF E-1 Football Championship squads